Mekinock is an unincorporated community in eastern Grand Forks County, North Dakota, United States. It lies northwest of the city of Grand Forks, the county seat of Grand Forks County. Mekinock's elevation is 860 feet (262 m). It has a post office with the ZIP code 58258.

References

Unincorporated communities in Grand Forks County, North Dakota
Unincorporated communities in North Dakota